The Soddy line of a triangle is the line that goes through the centers of the two Soddy circles of that triangle.

The Soody line intersects the Euler line in de Longchamps point und the Gergonne line in the Fletcher point. It is also perpendicular to the Gergonne line and together all three lines form the Euler-Gergonne-Soddy triangle.  The Gergonne point and the incenter of the triangle are located on the on the Soddy line as well.

The line is named after Nobel laureate Frederick Soddy, who published a proof of a special case of Descartes' theorem about tangent circles as a poem in Nature in 1936.

References 
 Zuming Feng: Why Are the Gergonne and Soddy Lines Perpendicular? A Synthetic Approach. In: Mathematics Magazin, Band 81, Nr. 3, Juni 2008, S. 211-214 (JSTOR)
Roger Alperin: The Gergonne and Soddy lines.  In: Elemente der Mathematik,. Band 70, Nr. 1, 2015, S. 1-6 (online)

External links 

 

Triangle geometry